Mahmoud Abd El Kader (born 12 May 1985) is an Egyptian volleyball player. He competed in the 2008 Summer Olympics.

References

1985 births
Living people
Volleyball players at the 2008 Summer Olympics
Egyptian men's volleyball players
Olympic volleyball players of Egypt
Al Ahly (men's volleyball) players